The 1908–09 Nemzeti Bajnokság II season was the 9th edition of the Nemzeti Bajnokság II, the second tier of the Hungarian football league system.

Rural districts

Western District

Northern District

1  Withdrew before the first match.

Southern District

2 Withdrew before the first match.

Eastern District

3 Withdrew.

4 Withdrew before the first match.

Urban Second League

1 Withdrew after the autumn rounds

2 Withdrew, Lipótváros Tournament Club considered successor.

For the title of "best rural team"

This year, for the first time, the championship team of the four rural districts took part in the tournament for the title of "Best Rural Team" at the MAC Margaret Island course in Budapest.

Semi-final:

Košice Athletic Club – Cluj-Napoca Commercial Academy Sports Circle 7: 0

Bácska Subotica AC – Győr Understanding Gymnastics Division(Gyor ETO) 0: 0, 0: 5

Final:

Košice Athletics Club – Győr Understanding Tournament Division 3: 2

National championship final

Due to the summer football ban, the first national championship final between the Kassai AC and the Budapest championship team took place on October 3.

Ferencváros Gymnastics Club - Kassai Athletics Club 11: 0

The match showed a very unequal balance of power and showed the gap between capital and rural football at the time.

References

Nemzeti Bajnokság II seasons
Football in Hungary